Katarína Uhlariková (born 9 February 1988) is a road cyclist from Slovakia. She represented her nation at the 2008 UCI Road World Championships.

References

External links
 profile at Procyclingstats.com

1988 births
Slovak female cyclists
Living people
Place of birth missing (living people)